This is a list of films produced in  China ordered by year of expected release in the 2010s. For an alphabetical listing of Chinese films see :Category:Chinese films

2010
 List of Chinese films of 2010

2011
 List of Chinese films of 2011

2012
 List of Chinese films of 2012

2013
 List of Chinese films of 2013

2014
 List of Chinese films of 2014

2015
 List of Chinese films of 2015

2016
 List of Chinese films of 2016

2017
 List of Chinese films of 2017

2018
 List of Chinese films of 2018

2019
 List of Chinese films of 2019

External links
IMDb list of Chinese films

Lists of 2010s films
2010s in Chinese cinema